Monday Creek is a tributary of the Hocking River,  long, in southeastern Ohio in the United States. Monday Creek has been badly affected by acid mine drainage.

Course and watershed

As of 1994, land use in the Monday Creek watershed was occupied this way:
Forest, 87%
Surface mining, 5%
Cropland, 3%
Wetlands, 2%
Grazing and pasture, 1% each
Urban, 1%

The Wayne National Forest owns 38% of land in the watershed; the largest private landowner is the Sunday Creek Mining Company.

History
The Adena, who lived in the region around 1000 BC, were the earliest known inhabitants of the Monday Creek area. Later native people of the region included the Lenape, Shawnee and Wyandot.  According to legend, early European explorers of the region named the stream for the day on which it was discovered. The previous day the explorers had similarly named nearby Sunday Creek. The earliest white settlements in the area date to 1774; the Ohio Company purchased all the land in the watershed in two installments in 1787 and 1792.

The aggressive pursuit of natural resources, including coal, timber, salt, iron, and clay took its toll on the watershed from the mid-19th century until well into the 20th century.  Iron production in the area aided the North during the Civil War. As much as 89% of the Monday Creek watershed was deforested by 1885, with replanting beginning with the establishment of the Wayne National Forest in 1935.  Salt mining occurred in the watershed in the 19th century; clay brick production peaked in the early 20th century; oil and natural gas production began in 1909.

The earliest coal mines in the watershed can be traced to the 1860s.  Early mines were underground, a practice which was in sharp decline by the 1920s and had ended completely in the watershed by 1991.  Surface mining was begun post-World War II and declined in the 1970s.  Coal in the watershed is primarily of the Middle Kittaning #6 variety, which is high in sulfur and has been identified by the Ohio EPA as having a high potential for pollution.

The Ohio Environmental Protection Agency has identified Monday Creek as having been "irretrievably altered to the extent that no appreciable aquatic life can be supported" due to severe contamination by acid mine drainage.

The Monday Creek Restoration Project, sponsored by Rural Action, has been working since 1994 to address water quality issues in the Monday Creek watershed.

See also 
List of rivers of Ohio
Sunday Creek (Ohio)

References

External links
Real-time water flow data for Monday Creek from the United States Geological Survey

Rivers of Athens County, Ohio
Rivers of Hocking County, Ohio
Rivers of Perry County, Ohio
Rivers of Ohio